Basketball contests at the 2011 European Youth Summer Olympic Festival were held from July 25, 2011 to July 29, 2011. Competitions for boys teams were played at the Pelitli Arena and for the girls teams at the 19 May Arena in Trabzon, Turkey. Eight nations in two groups of four teams each for boys and girls born 1994/1995 or later took part at the event.

Medal summary

Medal table

Medalist events

Boys

Group round

Group A

Group B

Final round

Championship bracket

5th–8th places bracket

5th–8th places

Semifinals

7th place

5th place

3rd place

Final

Girls

Group round

Group A

Group B

Final round

Championship bracket

5th–8th places bracket

5th–8th places

Semifinals

7th place

5th place

3rd place

Final

References

2011 European Youth Summer Olympic Festival
Basketball at the European Youth Summer Olympic Festival
2011–12 in European basketball
2011–12 in Turkish basketball
2011